William Byrne (born January 1960 in Gorey, County Wexford, Ireland) is an Irish retired hurler. He played hurling with his local club Naomh Éanna and was a member of the Wexford senior inter-county team throughout the 1980s and 1990s.

Career statistics

References

1960 births
Living people
Naomh Éanna hurlers
Wexford inter-county hurlers
Leinster inter-provincial hurlers
All-Ireland Senior Hurling Championship winners